Pattadon Janngeon (also known as Fiat, born 22 October 1996) is a Thai actor, singer and dancer. He is known for his main role as Tee in the film Grean Fictions (2013) and supporting roles as Dae in GMMTV's SOTUS S: The Series (2017) and Korn in The Gifted (2018).

Early life and education 
Pattadon was born in Chiang Mai, Thailand. He attended Montfort College for his primary and secondary education. In 2019, he graduated with a bachelor's degree in film and digital media from the Faculty of Communication Arts in Sripatum University Bangkhen Main Campus where he was a first-class honor.

Filmography

Film

Television

Discography

Awards and nominations

References

External links 
 
 

1996 births
Living people
Pattadon Janngeon
Pattadon Janngeon
Pattadon Janngeon
Pattadon Janngeon